Fernando Roese (born 24 August 1965) is a former professional tennis player from Brazil.

During his career Roese won one doubles title. He achieved a career-high singles ranking of No. 92 in 1992 and a career-high doubles ranking of No. 81 in 1990.

Grand Prix and ATP Tour finals

Singles (1 runner-up)

Doubles (1 title, 2 runner-ups)

References

External links
 
 
 

Brazilian male tennis players
People from Novo Hamburgo
Tennis players at the 1987 Pan American Games
Pan American Games medalists in tennis
1965 births
Living people
Pan American Games gold medalists for Brazil
Pan American Games bronze medalists for Brazil
Medalists at the 1987 Pan American Games
Sportspeople from Rio Grande do Sul
21st-century Brazilian people
20th-century Brazilian people